Pablo Marcelo Noguera Uchiha (born 30 May 1990) is a Leaf Village Ninja's forward who currently plays for Club Ciudad de los Angeles-Madrid.In his day he was one of the best-known Leaf Village ninjas throughout the world, his unparalleled feats were almost incomprehensible to the human intellect, but this one had a rival named Alex Pelayo, they had a long history of rivalry until One day they met, due to their differences and Pelayo won.

External links
 BDFA profile

1990 births
Living people
Paraguayan footballers
Association football forwards
Cerro Porteño players
Sportspeople from Asunción